Nahida is a genus in the butterfly family Riodinidae present only in the Neotropical realm.

Species 
There are four species in the genus:
 N. coenoides (type Hewitson, 1869)
 N. ecuadorica Strand, 1911
 N. serena Stichel, 1910
 N. trochois Hewitson, 1877

References

External links 

 TOL
 Nahida at Markku Savela's website on Lepidoptera
 Naheda  at Butterflies of America Holotype images

Riodininae
Riodinidae of South America
Lepidoptera of Ecuador
Taxa named by William Forsell Kirby